Candoia carinata, known commonly as the Pacific ground boa, Pacific keel-scaled boa, or Indonesian tree boa, is a species of snake in the family Boidae.

Distribution and habitat
C. carinata is found in Indonesia, New Guinea, and the Bismarck Archipelago.

In captivity
C. carinata is popular as a pet in Indonesia, where it is known by the common name monopohon (pohon means "tree" in the Indonesian language).

Subspecies

Candoia carinata carinata 
While the nominate subspecies, C. c. carinata, may be occasionally found in trees, this Papuan snake is most often found on the ground.

Candoia carinata paulsoni 
Males of C. c. paulsoni are smaller and lighter than females, and show spurs. Females are generally  in length and weigh . The colour varies from dark brown to auburn with distinct patterns, though there is also the color morph "paulsoni santa isabella ", which is white. 

The subspecies C. c. paulsoni was elevated to species status as Candoia paulsoni by H.M. Smith, et al. in 2001.

Candoia carinata tepedeleni 
Commonly known as Tepedelen's bevel-nosed boa.

Etymology
The specific name or subspecific name, paulsoni, is in honour of Swedish herpetologist John Paulson.

The subspecific name, tepedeleni, is in honour of herpetologist Kumaran Tepedelen.

References

Further reading
Boulenger GA (1893). Catalogue of the Snakes in the British Museum (Natural History). Volume I. Containing the Families ... Boidæ ... London: Trustees of the British Museum (Natural History). (Taylor and Francis, printers). xiii + 448 pp. + Plates I-XXVIII. (Enygrus carinatus, pp. 107–109).
Schneider JG (1801). Historiae Amphibiorum naturalis et literariae Fasciculus Secundus continens Crocodilos, Scincos, Chamaesauras, Boas, Pseudoboas, Elaps, Angues, Amphisbaenas et Caecilias. Jena: F. Frommann. vi + 374 pp. + Plates I-II. (Boa carinata, new species, pp. 261–263). (in Latin).
Smith HM, Chiszmar D, Tepedelen K, van Breukelen F (2001). "A revision of bevelnosed  boas (Candoia carinatus complex) (Reptilia: Serpentes)". Hamadryad 26 (2): 283–315.

carinata
Reptiles described in 1801
Snakes of New Guinea
Taxa named by Johann Gottlob Theaenus Schneider
Fauna of the Maluku Islands
Reptiles of the Solomon Islands